Ruth Elizabeth "Bette" Davis (April 5, 1908 – October 6, 1989) was an American actress with a career spanning more than 50 years and 100 acting credits. She was noted for playing unsympathetic, sardonic characters, and was famous for her performances in a range of film genres, from contemporary crime melodramas to historical films, suspense horror, and occasional comedies, although her greater successes were in romantic dramas. A recipient of two Academy Awards, she was the first thespian to accrue ten nominations.

Bette Davis appeared on Broadway in New York, then the 22-year-old Davis moved to Hollywood in 1930. After some unsuccessful films, she had her critical breakthrough playing a vulgar waitress in Of Human Bondage (1934) although, contentiously, she was not among the three nominees for the Academy Award for Best Actress that year. The next year, her performance as a down-and-out actress in Dangerous (1935) did land Davis her first Best Actress nomination, and she won. In 1937, she tried to free herself from her contract with Warner Brothers Studio; although she lost the legal case, it marked the start of more than a decade as one of the most celebrated leading ladies of U.S. cinema. The same year, she starred in Marked Woman, a film regarded as one of the most important in her early career. Davis's portrayal of a strong-willed 1850s southern belle in Jezebel (1938) won her a second Academy Award for Best Actress and was the first of five consecutive years in which she received a Best Actress nomination; the others were for Dark Victory (1939), The Letter (1940), The Little Foxes (1941) and Now, Voyager (1942).

Davis was known for her forceful and intense style of acting and gained a reputation as a perfectionist in her craft. She could be combative and confrontational with studio executives and film directors, as well as with her co-stars, expecting the same high standard of performance and commitment from them as she expected from herself. Her forthright manner, idiosyncratic speech, and ubiquitous cigarette contributed to a public persona that has been often imitated.

She played a Broadway star in All About Eve (1950), which earned her another Oscar nomination and won her the Cannes Film Festival Award for Best Actress. Her last Oscar nomination was for What Ever Happened to Baby Jane? (1962), which also starred her famous rival Joan Crawford. In the latter stage of her career, her most successful films were Death on the Nile (1978) and The Whales of August (1987). Her career went through several periods of eclipse, but despite a long period of ill health she continued acting in film and on television until shortly before her death from breast cancer in 1989. She admitted that her success had often been at the expense of her personal relationships. She was married four times, divorcing three and widowed once, when her second husband died unexpectedly. She raised her children largely as a single parent. Her daughter, B. D. Hyman, wrote a controversial memoir about her childhood, 1985's My Mother's Keeper.

Davis was the co-founder of the Hollywood Canteen, a free club for food, dancing and entertainment for servicemen during World War II, and was the first female president of the Academy of Motion Picture Arts and Sciences. She was also the first woman to receive a Lifetime Achievement Award from the American Film Institute. In 1999, Davis was placed second behind Katharine Hepburn on the American Film Institute's list of the greatest female stars of the classical Hollywood cinema era.

Life and career

1908–1929: Childhood and early acting career 

Ruth Elizabeth Davis, known from early childhood as "Betty", was born on April 5, 1908, in Lowell, Massachusetts, the daughter of Harlow Morrell Davis (1885–1938), a law student from Augusta, Maine, and subsequently a patent attorney, and Ruth Augusta (née Favór; 1885–1961), from Tyngsborough, Massachusetts. Davis's younger sister was Barbara Harriet.
In 1915, Davis's parents separated, Davis and her sister Barbara attended, for three years, a spartan boarding school called Crestalban in Lanesborough, Massachusetts, in the Berkshires. In the fall of 1921, her mother, Ruth Davis moved to New York City, using her children's tuition money to enroll in the Clarence White School of Photography, with an apartment on 144th Street at Broadway. She then worked as a portrait photographer.

The young Bette Davis later changed the spelling of her first name to Bette after Bette Fischer, a character in Honoré de Balzac's La Cousine Bette. During their time in New York, Davis became a Girl Scout where she became a patrol leader.  Her patrol won a competitive dress parade for Lou Hoover at Madison Square Garden.

Davis attended Cushing Academy, a boarding school in Ashburnham, Massachusetts, where she met her future husband, Harmon O. Nelson, known as Ham. In 1926, a then 18-year-old Davis saw a production of Henrik Ibsen's The Wild Duck with Blanche Yurka and Peg Entwistle. Davis later recalled, "The reason I wanted to go into theater was because of an actress named Peg Entwistle." Bette Davis interviewed with Eva Le Gallienne to be a student at her 14th Street theatre. Eva Le Gallienne felt Davis was not serious enough to attend her school, and described her attitude as "insincere" and "frivolous".

Davis auditioned for George Cukor's stock theater company in Rochester, New York; although he was not very impressed, he gave Davis her first paid acting assignment – a one-week stint playing the part of a chorus girl in the play Broadway. Ed Sikov sources Davis's first professional role to a 1929 production by the Provincetown Players of Virgil Geddes' play The Earth Between; however, the production was postponed by a year. In 1929, Davis was chosen by Blanche Yurka to play Hedwig, the character she had seen Entwistle play in The Wild Duck. After performing in Philadelphia, Washington, and Boston, she made her Broadway debut in 1929 in Broken Dishes and followed it with Solid South.

1930–1936: Early years in Hollywood 

After appearing on Broadway in New York, the 22-year-old Davis moved to Hollywood in 1930 to screen test for Universal Studios. She had been inspired to pursue a career as a film actress after seeing Mary Pickford in Little Lord Fauntleroy. Davis and her mother travelled by train to Hollywood. She later recounted her surprise that nobody from the studio was there to meet her. In fact, a studio employee had waited for her, but left because he saw nobody who "looked like an actress". She failed her first screen test, but was used in several screen tests for other actors. In a 1971 interview with Dick Cavett, she related the experience with the observation, "I was the most Yankee-est, most modest virgin who ever walked the earth. They laid me on a couch, and I tested fifteen men ... They all had to lie on top of me and give me a passionate kiss. Oh, I thought I would die. Just thought I would die." A second test was arranged for Davis, for the 1931 film A House Divided. Hastily dressed in an ill-fitting costume with a low neckline, she was rebuffed by the film director William Wyler, who loudly commented to the assembled crew, "What do you think of these dames who show their chests and think they can get jobs?".

Carl Laemmle, the head of Universal Studios, considered terminating Davis's employment, but cinematographer Karl Freund told him she had "lovely eyes" and would be suitable for Bad Sister (1931), in which she subsequently made her film debut. Her nervousness was compounded when she overheard the chief of production, Carl Laemmle Jr., comment to another executive that she had "about as much sex appeal as Slim Summerville", one of the film's co-stars. The film was not a success, and her next role in Seed (1931) was too brief to attract attention.

Universal Studios renewed her contract for three months, and she appeared in a small role in Waterloo Bridge (1931), before being lent to Columbia Pictures for The Menace, and to Capital Films for Hell's House (all 1932). After one year, and six unsuccessful films, Laemmle elected not to renew her contract.

Davis was preparing to return to New York when actor George Arliss chose Davis for the lead female role in the Warner Bros. picture The Man Who Played God (1932), and for the rest of her life, Davis credited him with helping her achieve her "break" in Hollywood. The Saturday Evening Post wrote, "She is not only beautiful, but she bubbles with charm", and compared her to Constance Bennett and Olive Borden. Warner Bros. signed her to a five-year contract, and she remained with the studio for the next 18 years.

Davis's first marriage was to Harmon Oscar Nelson on August 18, 1932, in Yuma, Arizona. Their marriage was scrutinized by the press; his $100 a week earnings ($1,885 in 2020 dollars) compared unfavourably with Davis's reported $1,000 a week income ($18,850). Davis addressed the issue in an interview, pointing out that many Hollywood wives earned more than their husbands, but the situation proved difficult for Nelson, who refused to allow Davis to purchase a house until he could afford to pay for it himself. Davis had several abortions during the marriage.

After more than 20 film roles, she had her critical breakthrough playing the role of the vicious and slatternly Mildred Rogers in the RKO Radio production of Of Human Bondage (1934), a film adaptation of W. Somerset Maugham's novel, earned Davis her first major critical acclaim although, contentiously, she was not among the three nominees for the Academy Award for Best Actress that year. Many actresses feared playing unsympathetic characters, and several had refused the role, but Davis viewed it as an opportunity to show the range of her acting skills. Her co-star, Leslie Howard, was initially dismissive of her, but as filming progressed, his attitude changed, and he subsequently spoke highly of her abilities. The director John Cromwell allowed her relative freedom: "I let Bette have her head. I trusted her instincts." She insisted that she be portrayed realistically in her death scene, and said: "The last stages of consumption, poverty, and neglect are not pretty, and I intended to be convincing-looking."

The film was a success, and Davis's characterization earned praise from critics, with Life writing that she gave "probably the best performance ever recorded on the screen by a U.S. actress". Davis anticipated that her reception would encourage Warner Bros. to cast her in more important roles, and was disappointed when Jack L. Warner refused to lend her to Columbia Studios to appear in It Happened One Night, and instead cast her in the melodrama Housewife. When Davis was not nominated for an Academy Award for Of Human Bondage, The Hollywood Citizen News questioned the omission, and Norma Shearer, herself a nominee, joined a campaign to have Davis nominated. This prompted an announcement from the Academy president, Howard Estabrook, who said that under the circumstances, "any voter ... may write on the ballot his or her personal choice for the winners", thus allowing, for the only time in the Academy's history, the consideration of a candidate not officially nominated for an award. The uproar led, however, to a change in academy voting procedures the following year, wherein nominations were determined by votes from all eligible members of a particular branch rather than by a smaller committee, with results independently tabulated by the accounting firm Price Waterhouse.

The next year, her performance as a down-and-out troubled actress in Dangerous (1935) received very good reviews  and landed Davis her first Best Actress nomination, and she won.

E. Arnot Robertson wrote in Picture Post:  The New York Times hailed her as "becoming one of the most interesting of our screen actresses". She won the Academy Award for Best Actress for the role, but commented that it was belated recognition for Of Human Bondage, calling the award a "consolation prize". For the rest of her life, Davis maintained that she gave the statue its familiar name of "Oscar" because its posterior resembled that of her husband, whose middle name was Oscar, although, the Academy of Motion Picture Arts and Sciences officially makes reference to another story.

Her next film, The Petrified Forest (1936), Davis co-starred with Leslie Howard and Humphrey Bogart.

In 1937, she tried to free herself from her contract with Warner Brothers Studio; although she lost the legal case, it marked the start of more than a decade as one of the most celebrated leading ladies of U.S. cinema.

Legal case 
Convinced that her career was being damaged by a succession of mediocre films, Davis accepted an offer in 1936 to appear in two films in Britain. Knowing that she was breaching her contract with Warner Bros., she fled to Canada to avoid legal papers being served on her. Eventually, Davis brought her case to court in Britain, hoping to get out of her contract. She later recalled the opening statement of the barrister representing Warner Bros., Patrick Hastings, in which he urged the court to "come to the conclusion that this is rather a naughty young lady, and that what she wants is more money". He mocked Davis's description of her contract as "slavery" by stating, incorrectly, that she was being paid $1,350 per week. He remarked, "If anybody wants to put me into perpetual servitude on the basis of that remuneration, I shall prepare to consider it." The British press offered little support to Davis, and portrayed her as overpaid and ungrateful.

Davis explained her viewpoint to a journalist: "I knew that, if I continued to appear in any more mediocre pictures, I would have no career left worth fighting for." Her counsel presented the complaints – that she could be suspended without pay for refusing a part, with the period of suspension added to her contract, that she could be called upon to play any part within her abilities, regardless of her personal beliefs, that she could be required to support a political party against her beliefs, and that her image and likeness could be displayed in any manner deemed applicable by the studio. Jack Warner testified, and was asked: "Whatever part you choose to call upon her to play, if she thinks she can play it, whether it is distasteful and cheap, she has to play it?". Warner replied: "Yes, she must play it." Davis lost the case, and returned to Hollywood, in debt and without income, to resume her career. Olivia de Havilland mounted a similar case in 1943, and won.

1937–1941: Success with Warner Bros.  
 
The same year, she starred with Humphrey Bogart in Marked Woman, (1937) a contemporary gangster drama inspired by the case of Lucky Luciano, a film regarded as one of the most important in her early career. She was awarded the Volpi Cup at the 1937 Venice Film Festival for her performance. 
 
Davis's portrayal of a strong-willed 1850s southern belle in Jezebel (1938) won her a second Academy Award for Best Actress, and was the first of five consecutive years in which she received the Best Actress nomination. During production, Davis entered a relationship with director William Wyler. She later described him as the "love of my life", and said that making the film with him was "the time in my life of my most perfect happiness". The film was a success, and Davis's performance as a spoiled Southern belle earned her a second Academy Award.

This led to speculation in the press that she would be chosen to play Scarlett O'Hara, a similar character, in Gone with the Wind. Davis expressed her desire to play Scarlett, and while David O. Selznick was conducting a search for the actress to play the role, a radio poll named her as the audience favorite. Warner offered her services to Selznick as part of a deal that also included Errol Flynn and Olivia de Havilland, but Selznick did not consider Davis as suitable, and rejected the offer, while Davis did not want Flynn cast as Rhett Butler. Newcomer Vivien Leigh was cast as Scarlett O'Hara, de Havilland landed a role as Melanie, and both of them were nominated for the Oscars, with Leigh winning.

Jezebel marked the beginning of the most successful phase of Davis's career, and over the next few years, she was listed in the annual Quigley Poll of the Top Ten Money-Making Stars, which was compiled from the votes of movie exhibitors throughout the U.S. for the stars who had generated the most revenue in their theaters over the previous year.

In contrast to Davis's success, her husband Ham Nelson had failed to establish a career for himself, and their relationship faltered. In 1938, Nelson obtained evidence that Davis was engaged in a sexual relationship with Howard Hughes, and subsequently filed for divorce, citing Davis's "cruel and inhuman manner".

Davis was emotional during the making of her next film, Dark Victory (1939), and considered abandoning it until the producer Hal B. Wallis convinced her to channel her despair into her acting. The film was among the high-grossing films of the year, and the role of Judith Traherne brought her an Academy Award nomination. In later years, Davis cited this performance as her personal favorite. Dark Victory featured Ronald Reagan and Humphrey Bogart in supporting roles.

She appeared in three other box-office hits in 1939: The Old Maid with Miriam Hopkins, Juarez with Paul Muni, and The Private Lives of Elizabeth and Essex with Errol Flynn. The last was her first color film, and her only color film made during the height of her career. To play the elderly Elizabeth I of England, Davis shaved her hairline and eyebrows.

During filming, she was visited on the set by the actor Charles Laughton. She commented that she had a "nerve" playing a woman in her 60s, to which Laughton replied: "Never not dare to hang yourself. That's the only way you grow in your profession. You must continually attempt things that you think are beyond you, or you get into a complete rut." Recalling the episode many years later, Davis remarked that Laughton's advice had influenced her throughout her career.

By this time, Davis was Warner Bros.' most profitable star, and she was given the most important of their female leading roles. Her image was considered with more care; although she continued to play character roles, she was often filmed in close-ups that emphasized her distinctive eyes. All This, and Heaven Too (1940) was the most financially successful film of Davis's career to that point.

The Letter (1940) was considered "one of the best pictures of the year" by The Hollywood Reporter, and Davis won admiration for her portrayal of an adulterous killer, a role originated onstage by Katharine Cornell. During this time, she was in a relationship with her former co-star George Brent, who proposed marriage. Davis refused, as she had met Arthur Farnsworth, a New England innkeeper, and Vermont dentist's son. Davis and Farnsworth were married at Home Ranch, in Rimrock, Arizona, in December 1940, her second marriage.

In January 1941, Davis became the first female president of the Academy of Motion Picture Arts and Sciences, but antagonized the committee members with her brash manner and radical proposals. Davis rejected the idea of her being just "a figurehead only". Faced with the disapproval and resistance of the committee, Davis resigned, and was succeeded by her predecessor Walter Wanger.

Davis starred in three movies in 1941, the first being The Great Lie, with George Brent. It was a refreshingly different role for Davis as she played a kind, sympathetic character.

William Wyler directed Davis for the third time in Lillian Hellman's The Little Foxes (1941), but they clashed over the character of Regina Giddens, a role originally played on Broadway by Tallulah Bankhead (Davis had portrayed in film a role initiated by Bankhead on the stage once beforein Dark Victory). Wyler encouraged Davis to emulate Bankhead's interpretation of the role, but Davis wanted to make the role her own. She received another Academy Award nomination for her performance, and never worked with Wyler again.

1942–1944: War effort and personal tragedy 
Davis was known for her forceful and intense style of acting and gained a reputation as a perfectionist in her craft. She could be combative and confrontational with studio executives and film directors, as well as with her co-stars, expecting the same high standard of performance and commitment from them as she expected from herself. Her forthright manner, idiosyncratic speech, and ubiquitous cigarette contributed to a public persona that has been often imitated.

Following the attack on Pearl Harbor, Davis spent the early months of 1942 selling war bonds. After Jack Warner criticized her tendency to cajole crowds into buying, she reminded him that her audiences responded most strongly to her "bitch" performances. She sold $2 million worth of bonds in two days, as well as a picture of herself in Jezebel for $250,000. She also performed for black regiments as the only white member of an acting troupe formed by Hattie McDaniel, which included Lena Horne and Ethel Waters.

At John Garfield's suggestion of opening a servicemen's club in Hollywood, Davis – with the aid of Warner, Cary Grant, and Jule Styne – transformed an old nightclub into the Hollywood Canteen, which opened on October 3, 1942. Hollywood's most important stars volunteered to entertain servicemen. Davis ensured that every night, a few important "names" would be there for the visiting soldiers to meet.

She appeared as herself in the film Hollywood Canteen (1944), which used the canteen as the setting for a fictional story. Davis later commented: "There are few accomplishments in my life that I am sincerely proud of. The Hollywood Canteen is one of them." In 1980, she was awarded the Distinguished Civilian Service Medal, the United States Department of Defense's highest civilian award, for her work with the Hollywood Canteen.

Davis showed little interest in the film Now, Voyager (1942), until Hal Wallis advised her that female audiences needed romantic dramas to distract them from the reality of their lives. It became one of the better known of her "women's pictures". In one of the film's most imitated scenes, Paul Henreid lights two cigarettes as he stares into Davis's eyes, and passes one to her. Film reviewers complimented Davis on her performance, the National Board of Review commenting that she gave the film "a dignity not fully warranted by the script".

During the early 1940s, several of Davis's film choices were influenced by the war, such as Watch on the Rhine (1943), by Lillian Hellman, and Thank Your Lucky Stars (1943), a lighthearted all-star musical cavalcade, with each of the featured stars donating their fees to the Hollywood Canteen. Davis performed a novelty song, "They're Either Too Young or Too Old", which became a hit record after the film's release.

Old Acquaintance (1943) reunited her with Miriam Hopkins in a story of two old friends who deal with the tensions created when one of them becomes a successful novelist. Davis felt that Hopkins tried to upstage her throughout the film. Director Vincent Sherman recalled the intense competition and animosity between the two actresses, and Davis often joked that she held back nothing in a scene in which she was required to shake Hopkins in a fit of anger.

In August 1943, Davis's husband Arthur Farnsworth collapsed while walking along a Hollywood street, and died two days later. An autopsy revealed that his fall had been caused by a skull fracture he had sustained two weeks earlier. Davis testified before an inquest that she knew of no event that might have caused the injury. A finding of accidental death was reached. Highly distraught, Davis attempted to withdraw from her next film Mr. Skeffington (1944), but Jack Warner, who had halted production following Farnsworth's death, persuaded her to continue.

Although she had gained a reputation for being forthright and demanding, her behavior during filming of Mr. Skeffington was erratic and out of character. She alienated Vincent Sherman by refusing to film certain scenes and insisting that some sets be rebuilt. She improvised dialogue, causing confusion among other actors, and infuriated the writer Julius Epstein, who was called upon to rewrite scenes at her whim. Davis later explained her actions with the observation "When I was most unhappy, I lashed out rather than whined." Some reviewers criticized Davis for the excess of her performance; James Agee wrote that she "demonstrates the horrors of egocentricity on a marathonic scale".

1945–1949: Professional setbacks 

In 1945, Davis married artist William Grant Sherry, her third husband, who also worked as a masseur. She had been drawn to him because he claimed he had never heard of her and was, therefore, not intimidated by her. The same year, Davis refused the title role in Mildred Pierce (1945), a role for which Joan Crawford won an Academy Award, and instead made The Corn Is Green (1945), based on a play by Emlyn Williams.

In The Corn Is Green Davis played Miss Moffat, an English teacher who saves a young Welsh miner (John Dall) from a life in the coal pits, by offering him education. The part had been played in the theatre by Ethel Barrymore (who was 61 at the play's premiere), but Warner Bros. felt that the film version should depict the character as a younger woman. Davis disagreed, and insisted on playing the part as written, and wore a gray wig and padding under her clothes, to create a dowdy appearance. The film was well received by critics, and made a profit of $2.2 million. The critic E. Arnot Robertson observed:  She concluded that "the subtle interpretation she insisted on giving" kept the focus on the teacher's "sheer joy in imparting knowledge".

Her next film, A Stolen Life (1946), was the only film that Davis made with her own production company, BD Productions. Davis played dual roles, as twins. The film received poor reviews, and was described by Bosley Crowther as "a distressingly empty piece"; but, with a profit of $2.5 million, it was one of her biggest box office successes. In 1947, the U.S. Treasury named Davis as the highest-paid woman in the country, with her share of the film's profit accounting for most of her earnings. Her next film was Deception (1946), the first of her films to lose money.

Possessed (1947) had been tailor-made for Davis, and was to have been her next project after Deception. However, she was pregnant and went on maternity leave. Joan Crawford played her role in Possessed, and was nominated for an Academy Award as Best Actress. In 1947, at the age of 39, Davis gave birth to daughter Barbara Davis Sherry (known as B.D.), and later wrote in her memoir that she became absorbed in motherhood and considered ending her career. As she continued making films, however, her relationship with her daughter B.D. began to deteriorate, and her popularity with audiences steadily declined.

Among the film roles offered to Davis following her return to film-making was Rose Sayer in The African Queen (1951). When informed that the film was to be shot in Africa, Davis refused the part, telling Jack Warner "If you can't shoot the picture in a boat on the back lot, then I'm not interested." Katharine Hepburn played the role, and was nominated for an Academy Award as Best Actress.

In 1948, Davis was cast in the melodrama Winter Meeting. Although she initially was enthusiastic, she soon learned that Warner had arranged for "softer" lighting to be used to disguise her age. She recalled that she had seen the same lighting technique "on the sets of Ruth Chatterton and Kay Francis, and I knew what they meant". To add to her disappointment, she was not confident in the abilities of her leading man – James Davis in his first major screen role. She disagreed with changes made to the script because of censorship restrictions, and found that many of the aspects of the role that initially appealed to her had been cut. The film was described by Bosley Crowther as "interminable", and he noted that "of all the miserable dilemmas in which Miss Davis has been involved ... this one is probably the worst". It failed at the box office, and the studio lost nearly $1 million.

While making June Bride (1948), Davis clashed with co-star Robert Montgomery, later describing him as "a male Miriam Hopkins... an excellent actor, but addicted to scene-stealing". The film marked her first comedy in several years, and earned her some positive reviews, but it was not particularly popular with audiences, and returned only a small profit.

Despite the lackluster box-office receipts from her more recent films, in 1949, she negotiated a four-film contract with Warner Bros. that paid $10,285 per week and made her the highest-paid woman in the United States. However, Jack Warner had refused to allow her script approval, and cast her in Beyond the Forest (1949). Davis reportedly loathed the script, and begged Warner to recast the role, but he refused. After the film was completed, her request to be released from her contract was honored.

The reviews of the film were scathing. Dorothy Manners, writing for the Los Angeles Examiner, described the film as "an unfortunate finale to her brilliant career". Hedda Hopper wrote: "If Bette had deliberately set out to wreck her career, she could not have picked a more appropriate vehicle." The film contained the line "What a dump!", which became closely associated with Davis after it was referenced in Edward Albee's Who's Afraid of Virginia Woolf?, and impersonators began to use it in their acts. Arthur Blake was a famous female impersonator of the post World-War II era who was particularly known for his performances as Bette Davis; notably impersonating her in the 1952 film Diplomatic Courier.

1949–1960: Starting a freelance career 

Davis filmed The Story of a Divorce (released by RKO Radio Pictures in 1951 as Payment on Demand).  She played a Broadway star in All About Eve (1950), which earned her another Oscar nomination and won her the Cannes Film Festival Award for Best Actress. Davis read the script, described it as the best she had ever read, and accepted the role. Within days, she joined the cast in San Francisco to begin filming. During production, she established what became a lifelong friendship with her co-star Anne Baxter and a romantic relationship with her leading man Gary Merrill, which led to marriage. The film's director Joseph L. Mankiewicz later remarked: "Bette was letter perfect. She was syllable-perfect. The director's dream: the prepared actress."

Critics responded positively to Davis's performance, and several of her lines became well-known, particularly "Fasten your seat belts, it's going to be a bumpy night". She was again nominated for an Academy Award, and critics such as Gene Ringgold described her Margo as her "all-time best performance". Pauline Kael wrote that much of Mankiewicz's vision of "the theater" was "nonsense", but commended Davis, writing "[the film is] saved by one performance that is the real thing: Bette Davis is at her most instinctive and assured. Her actress – vain, scared, a woman who goes too far in her reactions and emotions – makes the whole thing come alive."

Davis won a Best Actress award from the Cannes Film Festival, and the New York Film Critics Circle Award. She also received the San Francisco Film Critics Circle Award as Best Actress, having been named by them as the Worst Actress of 1949 for Beyond the Forest. During this time, she was invited to leave her hand prints in the forecourt of Grauman's Chinese Theatre.

On July 3, 1950, Davis's divorce from William Sherry was finalized, and on July 28, she married Gary Merrill, her fourth and final husband. With Sherry's consent, Merrill adopted B.D., Davis's daughter with Sherry. In January 1951, Davis and Merrill adopted a five-day-old baby girl they named Margot Mosher Merrill (born January 6, 1951 - died May 5, 2022), after the character Margo Channing. Davis and Merrill lived with their three children – in 1952, they adopted a baby boy, Michael (born February 5, 1952) – on an estate on the coast of Cape Elizabeth, Maine. (Davis and Merrill also stayed at Homewood Inn in Yarmouth, Maine, for six months.) After semi-retirement in the mid-1950s, Davis again starred in several movies during her time in Maine, including The Virgin Queen (1955), in which she played Queen Elizabeth I.

The family traveled to England, where Davis and Merrill starred in the murder-mystery film Another Man's Poison (1951). When it received lukewarm reviews and failed at the box office, Hollywood columnists wrote that Davis's comeback had petered out, and an Academy Award nomination for The Star (1952) did not halt her decline at the box office.

In 1952, Davis appeared in the Broadway revue Two's Company, directed by Jules Dassin. She was uncomfortable working outside of her area of expertise; she never had been a musical performer, and her limited theater experience had been more than 20 years earlier. She was also severely ill, and was operated on for osteomyelitis of the jaw. Margot was diagnosed as severely brain-damaged due to an injury sustained during or shortly after her birth, and was placed in an institution around the age of 3. Davis and Merrill began arguing frequently, and B.D. later recalled episodes of alcohol abuse and domestic violence.

Few of Davis's films of the 1950s were successful, and many of her performances were condemned by critics. The Hollywood Reporter wrote of mannerisms "that you'd expect to find in a nightclub impersonation of [Davis]", while the London critic Richard Winninger wrote

Her films of this period included Storm Center (1956) and The Catered Affair (1956). As her career declined, her marriage continued to deteriorate until she filed for divorce in 1960. The following year, her mother died. During the same time, she tried television, appearing in three episodes of the popular NBC Western Wagon Train as three different characters in 1959 and 1961; her first appearance on TV had been February 25, 1956, on General Electric Theatre.

In 1960, Davis, a registered Democrat, appeared at the 1960 Democratic National Convention in Los Angeles, where she met future President John F. Kennedy, whom she greatly admired. Outside of acting and politics, Davis was an active and practicing Episcopalian.

1961–1970: Renewed success 

In 1961, Davis opened in the Broadway production The Night of the Iguana to mostly mediocre reviews, and left the production after four months due to "chronic illness". She then joined Glenn Ford and Hope Lange for the Frank Capra film Pocketful of Miracles (1961), a remake of Capra's 1933 film, Lady for a Day, based on a story by Damon Runyon. Exhibitors protested her star billing as they considered it would negatively impact the box office performance and, despite the appearance of Ford, the film failed at the box office.

Her last Oscar nomination was for the Grand Guignol horror film What Ever Happened to Baby Jane? (1962), which also starred Joan Crawford.  Joan Crawford showed interest in the script and considered Davis for the part of Jane. Davis believed it could appeal to the same audience that had recently made Alfred Hitchcock's Psycho (1960) a success. She negotiated a deal that would pay her 10 percent of the worldwide gross profits in addition to her salary. The film became one of the year's big successes.

Davis and Crawford played two aging sisters, former actresses forced by circumstance to share a decaying Hollywood mansion. The director, Robert Aldrich, explained that Davis and Crawford were each aware of how important the film was to their respective careers, and commented: "It's proper to say that they really detested each other, but they behaved absolutely perfectly.".

After filming was completed, their public comments against each other allowed the tension to develop into a lifelong feud. When Davis was nominated for an Academy Award, Crawford contacted the other Best Actress nominees (who were unable to attend the ceremonies) and offered to accept the award on their behalf, should they win. When Anne Bancroft was announced as winner, Crawford accepted the award on Bancroft's behalf. Despite their dislike for each other, Davis and Crawford spoke highly of each other's talent in acting. Crawford said Davis was a "fascinating actress" but they were never able to become friends as they only worked on the one film together. Davis also said Crawford was a good, professional actress, but cared a lot about the way she looked, and her vanity. Their feud was eventually turned into the 2017 limited series Feud by Ryan Murphy.

Davis also received her only BAFTA nomination for this performance. Daughter Barbara (credited as B.D. Merrill) played a small role in the film, and when she and Davis visited the Cannes Film Festival to promote it, Barbara met Jeremy Hyman, an executive for Seven Arts Productions. After a short courtship, she married Hyman at the age of 16, with Davis's permission.

In October 1962, it was announced that four episodes of the CBS-TV series Perry Mason would feature special guest stars who would cover for Raymond Burr during his convalescence from surgery. A Perry Mason fan, Davis was the first of the guest stars. "The Case of Constant Doyle" began filming on December 12, 1962, and aired January 31, 1963.

In 1962, Davis appeared as Celia Miller on the TV western The Virginian in the episode titled "The Accomplice."

In September 1962, Davis placed an advertisement in Variety under the heading of "Situations wanted – women artists", which read: "Mother of three – 10, 11, & 15 – divorcee. American. Thirty years experience as an actress in Motion Pictures. Mobile still, and more affable than rumor would have it. Wants steady employment in Hollywood. (Has had Broadway.)" Davis said that she intended it as a joke, and she sustained her comeback over the course of several years.

Dead Ringer (1964) was a crime drama in which she played twin sisters. The film was an American adaptation of the Mexican film La Otra, starring Dolores del Río. Where Love Has Gone (1964) was a romantic drama based on a Harold Robbins novel. Davis played the mother of Susan Hayward, but filming was hampered by heated arguments between Davis and Hayward.

Hush...Hush, Sweet Charlotte (1964) was Robert Aldrich's follow-up to What Ever Happened to Baby Jane?. Aldrich planned to reunite Davis and Crawford, but the latter withdrew allegedly due to illness soon after filming began. She was replaced by Olivia de Havilland. The film was a considerable success, and brought renewed attention to its veteran cast, which included Joseph Cotten, Mary Astor, Agnes Moorehead, and Cecil Kellaway.

The following year, Davis was cast as the lead in an Aaron Spelling sitcom, The Decorator. A pilot episode was filmed, but was not shown, and the project was terminated. By the end of the decade, Davis had appeared in the British films The Nanny (1965), The Anniversary (1968), and Connecting Rooms (1970), none of which were reviewed well, and her career again stalled.

1971–1983: Later career 
In the early 1970s, Davis was invited to appear in New York City in a stage presentation titled Great Ladies of the American Cinema. Over five successive nights, a different female star discussed her career, and answered questions from the audience; Myrna Loy, Rosalind Russell, Lana Turner, Sylvia Sidney, and Joan Crawford were the other participants. Davis was well-received, and was invited to tour Australia with the similarly themed Bette Davis in Person and on Film; its success allowed her to take the production to the United Kingdom.

In 1972, Davis played the lead role in two television films that were each intended as pilots for upcoming series for ABC and NBC, Madame Sin, with Robert Wagner, and The Judge and Jake Wyler, with Doug McClure and Joan Van Ark, but in each case, the network decided against producing a series.

She appeared in the stage production Miss Moffat, a musical adaptation of her film The Corn Is Green, but after the show was panned by the Philadelphia critics during its pre-Broadway run, she cited a back injury, and abandoned the show, which closed immediately.

She played supporting roles in Luigi Comencini's Lo Scopone scientifico (1972) with Joseph Cotten and Italian actors Alberto Sordi and Silvana Mangano, Burnt Offerings (1976), a Dan Curtis film, and The Disappearance of Aimee (1976), but she clashed with Karen Black and Faye Dunaway, the stars of the two latter respective productions, because she felt that neither extended her an appropriate degree of respect and that their behavior on the film sets was unprofessional.

In 1977, Davis became the first woman to receive the American Film Institute's Lifetime Achievement Award. The televised event included comments from several of Davis's colleagues, including William Wyler, who joked that given the chance, Davis would still like to re-film a scene from The Letter to which Davis nodded. Jane Fonda, Henry Fonda, Natalie Wood, and Olivia de Havilland were among the performers who paid tribute, with de Havilland commenting that Davis "got the roles I always wanted".

Following the telecast, she found herself in demand again, often having to choose between several offers. She accepted roles in the television miniseries The Dark Secret of Harvest Home (1978) and the theatrical film Death on the Nile (1978), an Agatha Christie murder mystery. The bulk of her remaining work was for television. She won an Emmy Award for Strangers: The Story of a Mother and Daughter (1979) with Gena Rowlands, and was nominated for her performances in White Mama (1980) and Little Gloria... Happy at Last (1982). She also played supporting roles in the Disney films Return from Witch Mountain (1978) and The Watcher in the Woods (1980).

Davis's name became well known to a younger audience when Kim Carnes's song "Bette Davis Eyes" (written by Donna Weiss and Jackie DeShannon) became a worldwide hit and the best-selling record of 1981 in the U.S., where it stayed at number one on the music charts for more than two months. Davis's grandson was impressed that she was the subject of a hit song and Davis considered it a compliment, writing to both Carnes and the songwriters, and accepting the gift of gold and platinum records from Carnes, and hanging them on her wall.

She continued acting for television, appearing in Family Reunion (1981) with her grandson J. Ashley Hyman, A Piano for Mrs. Cimino (1982), and Right of Way (1983) with James Stewart. In 1983, she was awarded the Women in Film Crystal Award.

1983–1989: Illness, awards, and final works 
Her career went through several periods of eclipse, but despite a long period of ill health she continued acting in film and on television until shortly before her death from breast cancer in 1989. She admitted that her success had often been at the expense of her personal relationships. She was married four times, divorcing three  and widowed once. She raised her children largely as a single parent.
In 1983, after filming the pilot episode for the television series Hotel, Davis was diagnosed with breast cancer and underwent a mastectomy. Within two weeks of her surgery, she had four strokes which caused paralysis in the left side of her face and in her left arm, and left her with slurred speech. She commenced a lengthy period of physical therapy, and aided by her personal assistant Kathryn Sermak gained partial recovery from the paralysis. Even late in life, Davis smoked 100 cigarettes per day.

During this time, her relationship with her daughter B.D. Hyman deteriorated when Hyman became a born-again Christian and attempted to persuade Davis to follow suit. With her health stable, she traveled to England to film the Agatha Christie mystery Murder with Mirrors (1985). Upon her return, she learned that Hyman had published My Mother's Keeper, in which she chronicled a difficult mother-daughter relationship and depicted scenes of Davis's overbearing and drunken behavior.

Several of Davis's friends commented that Hyman's depiction of events was not accurate; one said "So much of the book is out of context". Mike Wallace re-broadcast a 60 Minutes interview he had filmed with Hyman a few years earlier in which she commended Davis on her skills as a mother, and said that she had adopted many of Davis's principles in raising her own children.

Critics of Hyman noted that Davis financially supported the Hyman family for several years and had recently saved them from losing their house. Despite the acrimony of their divorce years earlier, Gary Merrill also defended Davis. Interviewed by CNN, Merrill said that Hyman was motivated by "cruelty and greed". Davis's adopted son Michael Merrill ended contact with Hyman, and refused to speak to her again, as did Davis, who disinherited her.

In her second memoir This 'n That (1987), Davis wrote: "I am still recovering from the fact that a child of mine would write about me behind my back, to say nothing about the kind of book it is. I will never recover as completely from B.D.'s book as I have from the stroke. Both were shattering experiences." Her memoir concluded with a letter to her daughter, in which she addressed her several times as Hyman, and described her actions as "a glaring lack of loyalty and thanks for the very privileged life I feel you have been given". She concluded with a reference to the title of Hyman's book, "If it refers to money, if my memory serves me right, I've been your keeper all these many years. I am continuing to do so, as my name has made your book about me a success."

Davis appeared in the television film As Summers Die (1986), and in Lindsay Anderson's film The Whales of August (1987), in which she played the blind sister of Lillian Gish. Though in poor health at the time, Davis memorized her own and everyone else's lines as she always had. The film earned good reviews, with one critic writing: "Bette crawls across the screen like a testy old hornet on a windowpane, snarling, staggering, twitching – a symphony of misfired synapses." Davis became an honouree of the Kennedy Center Honors for her contribution to films in 1987.

Her last performance was the title role in Larry Cohen's Wicked Stepmother (1989). By this time, her health was failing, and after disagreements with Cohen, she walked off the set. The script was rewritten to place more emphasis on Barbara Carrera's character, and the reworked version was released after Davis's death.

After abandoning Wicked Stepmother, and with no further film offers (though she was keen to play the centenarian in Craig Calman's The Turn of the Century, and worked with him on adapting the stage play to a feature-length screenplay), Davis appeared on several talk shows, and was interviewed by Johnny Carson, Joan Rivers, Larry King, and David Letterman, discussing her career, but refusing to discuss her daughter. Her appearances were popular; Lindsay Anderson observed that the public enjoyed seeing her behaving "so bitchy": "I always disliked that because she was encouraged to behave badly. And I'd always hear her described by that awful word, feisty."

During 1988 and 1989, Davis was honored for her career achievements, receiving the Legion of Honor from France, the Campione d'Italia from Italy, and the Film Society of Lincoln Center Lifetime Achievement Award. She appeared on British television in a special broadcast from the South Bank Centre, discussing film and her career, the other guest being the renowned Russian director Andrei Tarkovsky.

Death 

Davis collapsed during the American Cinema Awards in 1989, and later discovered that her cancer had returned. She recovered sufficiently to travel to Spain, where she was honored at the Donostia-San Sebastián International Film Festival, but during her visit, her health rapidly deteriorated. Too weak to make the long journey back to the U.S., she traveled to France, where she died on October 6, 1989, at the American Hospital in Neuilly-sur-Seine. Davis was 81 years old. A memorial tribute was held by invitation only at Burbank Studio's stage 18 where a work light was turned on signaling the end of production.

She was entombed in Forest Lawn-Hollywood Hills Cemetery in Los Angeles, alongside her mother Ruthie and sister Bobby, with her name in larger letters. On her tombstone is written: "She did it the hard way", an epitaph that she mentioned in her memoir Mother Goddam as having been suggested to her by Joseph L. Mankiewicz shortly after they had filmed All About Eve.

Reception and legacy 
As early as 1936, Graham Greene summarized Davis: 

In 1964, Jack Warner spoke of the "magic quality that transformed this sometimes bland and not beautiful little girl into a great artist", and in a 1988 interview, Davis remarked that, unlike many of her contemporaries, she had forged a career without the benefit of beauty. She admitted she was terrified during the making of her early films, and that she became tough by necessity. "Until you're known in my profession as a monster, you are not a star", she said, "[but] I've never fought for anything in a treacherous way. I've never fought for anything but the good of the film." During the making of All About Eve (1950), Joseph L. Mankiewicz told her of the perception in Hollywood that she was difficult, and she explained that when the audience saw her on screen, they did not consider that her appearance was the result of numerous people working behind the scenes. If she was presented as "a horse's ass ... forty feet wide, and thirty feet high", that is all the audience "would see or care about".

While lauded for her achievements, Davis and her films were sometimes derided; Pauline Kael described Now, Voyager (1942) as a "shlock classic", and by the mid-1940s, her sometimes mannered and histrionic performances had become the subject of caricature. Edwin Schallert, for the Los Angeles Times, praised Davis's performance in Mr. Skeffington (1944), while observing, "The mimics will have more fun than a box of monkeys imitating Miss Davis"; and Dorothy Manners, at the Los Angeles Examiner, said of her performance in the poorly received Beyond the Forest (1949): "No night club caricaturist has ever turned in such a cruel imitation of the Davis mannerisms as Bette turns on herself in this one." Time magazine noted that Davis was compulsively watchable, even while criticizing her acting technique, summarizing her performance in Dead Ringer (1964) with the observation, "Her acting, as always, isn't really acting: It's shameless showing off. But just try to look away!"

Davis attracted a following in the gay subculture, and was frequently imitated by female impersonators such as Tracey Lee, Craig Russell, Jim Bailey, and Charles Pierce. Attempting to explain her popularity with gay audiences, the journalist Jim Emerson wrote: "Was she just a camp figurehead because her brittle, melodramatic style of acting hadn't aged well? Or was it that she was 'Larger Than Life', a tough broad who had survived? Probably some of both."

Her film choices were often unconventional: Davis sought roles as manipulators and killers in an era when actresses usually preferred to play sympathetic characters, and she excelled in them. She favored authenticity over glamour, and was willing to change her own appearance if it suited the character.

As she entered old age, Davis was acknowledged for her achievements. John Springer, who had arranged her speaking tours of the early 1970s, wrote that despite the accomplishments of many of her contemporaries, Davis was "the star of the thirties and into the forties", achieving notability for the variety of her characterizations and her ability to assert herself, even when her material was mediocre. Individual performances continued to receive praise; in 1987, Bill Collins analyzed The Letter (1940), and described her performance as "a brilliant, subtle achievement", and wrote: "Bette Davis makes Leslie Crosbie one of the most extraordinary females in movies." In a 2000 review for All About Eve (1950), Roger Ebert noted: "Davis was a character, an icon with a grand style; so, even her excesses are realistic." In House of Wax (2005), in her attempt to blend in with the other wax figures in the local movie house, the lead female character has to sit through a scene from Whatever Happened to Baby Jane . In 2006, Premiere magazine ranked her portrayal of Margo Channing in the film as fifth on their list of 100 Greatest Performances of All Time, commenting: "There is something deliciously audacious about her gleeful willingness to play such unattractive emotions as jealousy, bitterness, and neediness." While reviewing What Ever Happened to Baby Jane? (1962) in 2008, Ebert asserted that, "No one who has seen the film will ever forget her."

A few months before her death in 1989, Davis was one of several actors featured on the cover of Life magazine. In a film retrospective that celebrated the films and stars of 1939, Life concluded that Davis was the most significant actress of her era, and highlighted Dark Victory (1939) as one of the more important films of the year. Her death made front-page news throughout the world as the "close of yet another chapter of the Golden Age of Hollywood". Angela Lansbury summarized the feeling of those of the Hollywood community who attended her memorial service, commenting, after a sample from Davis's films was screened, that they had witnessed "an extraordinary legacy of acting in the twentieth century by a real master of the craft" that should provide "encouragement and illustration to future generations of aspiring actors".

In 1977, Davis became the first woman to be honored with the AFI Life Achievement Award. In 1999, the American Film Institute published its list of the "AFI's 100 Years...100 Stars", which was the result of a film-industry poll to determine the "50 Greatest American Screen Legends" in order to raise public awareness and appreciation of classic film. Of the 25 actresses listed, Davis was ranked at number two, behind Katharine Hepburn.

The United States Postal Service honored Davis with a commemorative postage stamp in 2008, marking the 100th anniversary of her birth. The stamp features an image of her in the role of Margo Channing in All About Eve. The First Day of Issue celebration took place September 18, 2008, at Boston University, which houses an extensive Davis archive. Featured speakers included her son Michael Merrill and Lauren Bacall. In 1997, the executors of her estate, Merrill and Kathryn Sermak, her former assistant, established The Bette Davis Foundation, which awards college scholarships to promising actors and actresses.

Journalist Jeanine Basinger of The New York Times wrote:

In 2017, Sermak published the memoir Miss D & Me: Life With the Invincible Bette Davis, a book Davis had requested Sermak write, detailing their years spent together.

Academy Awards 

Davis established several Oscar milestones. Among them, she became the first person to earn five consecutive Academy Award nominations for acting, all in the Best Actress category (1938–1942). Her record has only been matched by one other performer, Greer Garson, who also earned five consecutive nominations in the Best Actress category (1941–1945), including three years when both these actresses were nominated.

In 1962, Bette Davis became the first person to secure 10 Academy Award nominations for acting (though one could argue her 10th nomination was in 1952, and her 11th in 1962, as her write-in nomination for "Of Human Bondage" remains a source of contention (she came in 3rd in the voting, ahead of official nominee Grace Moore). Since then only three people have surpassed this figure, Meryl Streep (with 21 nominations and three wins), Katharine Hepburn (12 nominations and 4 wins), and Jack Nicholson (12 nominations and 3 wins) with Laurence Olivier matching the number (10 nominations and 1 win).

Steven Spielberg purchased Davis's Oscars for Dangerous (1935) and Jezebel (1938), when they were offered for auction for $207,500 and $578,000, respectively, and returned them to the Academy of Motion Picture Arts and Sciences.

Davis's performance in Of Human Bondage (1934) was widely acclaimed and, when she was not nominated for an Academy Award, several influential people mounted a campaign to have her name included. The Academy relaxed its rules for that year (and the following year also) to allow for the consideration of any performer nominated in a write-in vote; therefore, any performance of the year was technically eligible for consideration. For a period of time in the 1930s, the Academy revealed the second- and third-place vote getters in each category: Davis placed third for best actress above the officially nominated Grace Moore.

Selected filmography

See also 
 Motion Picture Production Code (Hays Code)
 Classical Hollywood cinema

References

Bibliography

External links 

  - operated by the Estate of Bette Davis
 
 
 
 
 
 
 
 Portraits from "The Little Foxes", 1941 by Ned Scott
 Kathryn Sermak recounts living with Bette Davis, interview October, 2017, News-Sentinel, accessed October 25, 2017.

 
1908 births
1989 deaths
20th-century American actresses
20th-century American memoirists
20th-century American women writers
Actors from Lowell, Massachusetts
Actresses from Massachusetts
American Episcopalians
American film actresses
American radio actresses
American stage actresses
American television actresses
American women memoirists
Best Actress Academy Award winners
Burials at Forest Lawn Memorial Park (Hollywood Hills)
California Democrats
AFI Life Achievement Award recipients
Cannes Film Festival Award for Best Actress winners
Cecil B. DeMille Award Golden Globe winners
César Honorary Award recipients
Deaths from breast cancer
Deaths from cancer in France
Kennedy Center honorees
Massachusetts Democrats
MGM Records artists
Outstanding Performance by a Lead Actress in a Miniseries or Movie Primetime Emmy Award winners
People from Dennis, Massachusetts
Presidents of the Academy of Motion Picture Arts and Sciences
Volpi Cup for Best Actress winners
Warner Bros. contract players
United Service Organizations entertainers